Cryptaspasma phycitinana is a species of moth of the family Tortricidae. It is found in Kenya and Tanzania.

The larvae feed on Ocimum suave.

References

Moths described in 2005
Microcorsini